The 2012 Houston Texans season was the franchise's 11th season in the National Football League and the 7th under head coach Gary Kubiak. The Texans improved on their 10–6 record from 2011, finishing two games better with a 12-4 mark, which still stands as the best record in team history. The Texans won their second consecutive AFC South division title, and defeated the Cincinnati Bengals in the Wild Card round of the playoffs for a second consecutive season. However, they were defeated by the New England Patriots in the Divisional round. The 2012 Texans hold the record for most points ever scored in the average game of a season for the team with 26 points, including scoring 126 points within the first four games. They scored 26 points or more seven times.

2012 draft class

Notes
From Buccaneers
 The team traded linebacker DeMeco Ryans to the Philadelphia Eagles in exchange for the Eagles' fourth-round selection (#99 overall; originally acquired from the Tampa Bay Buccaneers), and swapped third-round selections with the Eagles (the Texans originally held the #88 selection).
From the Patriots through the Broncos and the Buccaneers.

Staff

Final roster

Schedule

Preseason

Regular season

Note: Intra-division opponents are in bold text.

Postseason

Game summaries

Regular season

Week 1: vs. Miami Dolphins

The Houston Texans began their 10th anniversary campaign with lofty expectations, with many columnists picking them to represent the AFC in the Super Bowl.  Despite the lofty expectations, the Texans began the season rather flatly, only managing a field goal on offense against a younger, more inexperienced Dolphins team.  Miami played the Texans tough throughout the first half, thanks in part to Reggie Bush's contributions on the ground.  However, the game took a stunning turn after the two-minute warning of the first half as the Texans forced three Dolphin turnovers, and quickly converted them into touchdowns to stretch the lead to 24–3 before halftime.  The Texans continued to ride their defense to a season opening 30–10 win over Miami.  Houston improved to 7–0 all-time against the Miami Dolphins as they started their season 1–0.

Week 2: at Jacksonville Jaguars

The Texans entered their first division clash of the season looking to establish their will on the ground.  Behind a punishing ground attack with Arian Foster and Ben Tate, as well as an efficient defensive effort led by second year defensive lineman J.J. Watt, the Texans dominated the game with a time of possession of 43:17 on their way to a 27–7 victory in Jacksonville.  With the win, the Texans improved to 2–0 for the 3rd straight season. On the first drive, Houston drove 60 yards aided by Tate and took a 3-0 lead on a Shayne Graham 31 yard field goal. The Jaguars mounted a drive into Texan territory but they had to punt from the 44. Both teams went three-and-out on their next drive.  After a long pass play, the Texans were at the 1. 2 plays later Arian Foster ran it in from the 1 to make it 10-0. Two drives later Houston scored on an 8-yard run from Ben Tate. At halftime it was 17-0 Texans. In the 3rd quarter, quarterback Matt Schaub threw an interception returned to the Houston 37. Jacksonville scored in just 2 plays on a Td pass from Blaine Gabbert to running back Maurice-Jones Drew. It was 17-7. Then the Texans made a 17 play drive resulting in a 2-yard Ben Tate touchdown to make it 24-7. The Texans would get a field goal to make it 27-7, and that would end the game.

Week 3: at Denver Broncos

The Texans entered this highly anticipated early season matchup coming face-to-face once again with a familiar longtime AFC South nemesis in the form of former Colts quarterback Peyton Manning, who had sat out the 2011 season due to a neck injury.  Now back and in Denver, Manning came into the game looking to continue his mastery over the Houston Texans franchise.  However, it was Matt Schaub who took control of the game early, throwing 4 touchdown passes, and overcoming a brutal hit where he lost a chunk of his ear.  Despite Peyton Manning fueling a Broncos comeback attempt in the 4th quarter, the Texans were able to hang on and defeat the Broncos by 6 points.  With the win, the Texans improved to 3–0 for the first time ever. This was also their first road victory against Peyton Manning as they improved to 1–0 against Peyton in road games as a Bronco (0–9 vs. Peyton on the road as a Colt). The Broncos sacked Matt Schaub on the 2nd drive of the game making it 2-0. The Broncos drove 48 yards and kicked a 32-yard field goal from Matt Prater to make it 5-0. On the next drive, Schaub threw a 60-yard touchdown pass to Andre Johnson to make it 7-5. On their next drive, Houston went on a 98-yard drive resulting in a 3-yard touchdown pass from Schaub to Arian Foster making it 14-5. After a 3-and-out by Denver, Schaub threw a 52-yard touchdown pass to Kevin Walters to make it 21-5. Denver scored a field goal by Prater to make it 21-8. Denver would get another field goal before the half ended to make it 21-11. To open the second half Houston scored to make it 24-11. Then Schaub threw to Owen Daniels to make it 31-11. But after a Houston fumble, Denver scored its first touchdown of the night to cut it to 31-18. After a punt, Denver scored again to make it 31-25. However Houston stopped a desperation lateral play to win 31-25 and improve to 3-0. Schaub threw for 4 touchdowns and played his best game of the season up to that point.

Week 4: vs. Tennessee Titans

Despite Chris Johnson breaking out with his first 100+ yard rushing game for the Titans this season, Tennessee was unable to contain a dynamic Texans team, who recorded two touchdowns on defense en route to blowout the former Oilers 38–14.  With the win, the Texans improved to 4–0 for the first time in franchise history. On the opening drive of the game, Matt Schuab threw an 11-yard touchdown to make it 7-0. 2 drives later, Arian Foster scored a touchdown of 4 yards to make it 14-0 at the end of the first. Tennessee got going in the second with a 19-yard touchdown making it 14-7. That was the score at the half. In the third Matt Hasselbeck dropped back but was picked of by Danieal Manning and returned for a touchdown making it 21-7. On Houston's next drive, Schuab threw a 28-yard touchdown to Owen Daniels to make it 28-7 at the end of the third. In the fourth Tennessee fumbled giving it to Houston who took a 31-7 lead. Tennessee then threw an interception returned 63 yards for a touchdown. It was 38-7. Tennessee scored late in the game to make it 38-14 and that was the final score.

Week 5: at New York Jets

Many expected the Texans to roll through the seemingly dismal Jets team in their first primetime appearance of the season.  Even though the Texans never trailed in the game, the Jets kept pace throughout, thanks in large part to a 100-yard kickoff return touchdown by the Jets' Joe McKnight.  The Texans were able to keep the Jets at bay just enough to earn a hard-fought win on the road, and improve to 5–0, remaining one of only two teams undefeated in the NFL to this point along with the Atlanta Falcons.  This was also the first time the Texans have ever defeated the New York Jets in their 11-year history, making them 1–5 against the Jets overall and improving their regular season record to 5–0. On the opening drive Houston scored to take a 7-0 lead. Houston got the ball but was intercepted at their own 35. Mark Sanchez threw a touchdown to Josh Cumberland to make it 7-7. In the second, Arian Foster scored to make it 14-7. A Shayne Graham field goal made it 17-7 at the half. Houston would kick another field goal to make it 20-7. The ensuing kickoff was returned by Joe McKnight 100 yards to make it 20-14. Another Houston field goal made it 23-14. The Jets would get a field goal before the game ended to end it 23-17 Houston. The Texans improved to 5-0.

Week 6: vs. Green Bay Packers

The Texans came into their first ever appearance on Sunday Night Football facing playoff favorites Green Bay, who had shockingly started the season 2–3, one of those losses ending in controversy.  And coming off another disappointing loss to Indianapolis the week before, the Green Bay Packers took out all of their early season frustrations out on the Texans at Reliant Stadium, and at the same time, reestablished themselves as the team to beat in the NFC.  Aaron Rodgers tore up the Texans defense with 6 touchdown passes, and the Packers as the Texans dropped to 5–1 and 0–1 on Sunday Night Football. On the second drive of the game, Aaron Rodgers threw a touchdown to James Jones to make it 7-0. A few drives later it was 14-0 on a Rodgers to Jones touchdown. Houston scored 1 drive later on an Arian Foster touchdown run to make it 14-7. Then Rodgers hit Jordy Nelson to make it 21-7. Before the half ended, Houston got a field goal to make it 21-10 at the half. Mason Crosby made a field goal but was nullified by Houston being offsides. Rodgers then hit Nelson to make it
28-10. Foster scored again to make it 28-17. On the next drive, Rodgers found Tom Crabtree to make it 35-17. After a Texan interception, Rodgers found James Jones again to make it 42-17. Houston scored before the buzzer to have the final score 42-24.

Week 7: vs. Baltimore Ravens
Battle Red Day

The Texans had little time to think about the disappointing results the week before at home against Green Bay, as the Baltimore Ravens, the team who had eliminated them in the divisional round of the playoffs the previous year, were coming to town.  The Texans rebounded from their worst performance of the year with arguably one of their best as they had limited Baltimore's revitalized offense to just 13, forcing two turnovers in an impressive win going into the bye week.  It was the first time the Texans had ever defeated the Ravens in their franchise history (they had lost the previous six meetings, including the playoff matchup).  Reliant Stadium set a new Texans home attendance record of 71,708 fans during the regular season.  Likewise, the Ravens and Texans were the only 2 teams in the AFC who were above .500 at the point of this game.  However, the Texans surprisingly won it as the team went into their bye week at 6–1 and also went 1–6 all-time against the Ravens. The Texans punted to the Ravens who kicked a field goal to take a 3-0 lead. 3 drives later, Joe Flacco was sacked in his own endzone. That gave Houston 2 points and the ball. It was 3-2. Matt Schuab found Kevin Walters to make it 9-3 at the end of the first. Then Flacco was picked off at the Houston 48. Jonathan Joseph ran it back 52 yards for a touchdown to make it 16-3. On the next drive, Schuab found Owen Daniels to make it 23-3. Randy Bullock kicked 2 field goals to make it 29-3 at the half. Flacco found Tandon Doss to make it 29-10. Then Arian Foster scored to make it 36-10. Justin Tucker kicked a field goal to make it 36-13. Then Arian Foster ran in for the final score of the game making it 43-13.

Week 9: vs. Buffalo Bills

The game marked the anticipated return of former Texans number one draft pick Mario Williams, who had signed a multi-year $100 million contract with the Bills over the offseason, back to Reliant Stadium.  While Williams performed well in his return, the Bills were unable to muster up a touchdown drive over the Texans defense as Houston improved to 7–1 with a 21–9 win.  Also, the team took the all-time series to .500 with a 3–3 record against the Bills. Houston scored first on a 39-yard touchdown to make it 7-0. After 2 straight missed field goals by both teams, the Bills made one to cut it to 7-3. Buffalo got another field goal to make it 7-6 at the half. In the 3rd, Arian Foster scored to make it 14-6. Late in the 3rd, Buffalo made another field goal to make it 14-9. Schuab found Garrett Graham to make the final score 21-9. Houston improve to 7-1

Week 10: at Chicago Bears

The primetime game was played in a mix of rain and snow at Soldier Field, conditions that have typically meant trouble for teams that play their home games in warm weather or controlled environments, such as the Texans.  Despite the conditions, the Texans were able to ground out a 13–6 win on the road to improve to 8–1 on the season, 3–0 overall against the Chicago Bears and 1–1 on Sunday Night Football. On their 2nd drive of the game, Houston kicked a field goal to make it 3-0. After that, 4 straight turnovers occurred;2 for each team. After the last turnover, Chicago drove down the field and kicked it through to make it 3-3. Houston then had Matt Schuab throw it to Arian Foster to make it 10-3. Chicago then threw an interception at the end of the half. In the middle of the 3rd quarter, Robbie Gould kicked it through to cut it to 10-6. In the 4th, Houston kicked a field goal to make it 13-6. Chicago turned it over to end the game. The Texans improved to 8-1.

Week 11: vs. Jacksonville Jaguars

After a hard-fought win in Chicago, and on the cusp of a short turnaround for a Thursday afternoon matchup in Detroit the following week, the 8–1 Texans hosted the 1–8 Jaguars at Reliant.  The Texans survived an upset scare from Jacksonville thanks to a career-high 527 passing yards from Matt Schaub and 275 receiving yards from Andre Johnson.  Notably, the Texans became the first NFL team to score twice in an overtime period under the new overtime format. To open the game Matt Schuab found Keshawn Martin to make it 7-0. Then Chad Henne found Marcedes Lewis to make it 7-7. After a Texan punt, Henne found Cecil Shorts III to make it 14-7. Schuab then hit Jurrell Casey to tie it at 14. Both teams made field goals and it was 17-17 at the half. The Jaguars made a field goal to make it 20-17. After another Texan fumble, Henne found Marcedes Lewis to make it 27-17. A field goal cut it to 27-20. Then Schuab threw a pick. Henne then threw an 81-yard touchdown to Justin Blackmon to make it 34-20. The Texans answered right back with an Arian Foster td to make it 34-27. After a punt, Schuab found Garrett Graham to make it 34-34. With 5 seconds left, Randy Bullock missed a 47 yarder that could have won the game. In overtime, both teams made field goals to make it 37-37. Jacksonville had a chance to win after Houston threw an interception but they couldn't convert 4th down. With 2:10 left in overtime, Schuab threw a 48-yard touchdown pass to Andre Johnson to win 43-37. 
With the win, the Texans improved to 9–1 as the team swept the Jaguars.

Week 12: at Detroit Lions
Thanksgiving Day game

After defeating the Jaguars at home in overtime, the Texans traveled to Detroit to play in their first ever Thanksgiving Day game.  Many touchdowns were scored between both of the teams, but the Texans got the better edge of it when Justin Forsett ran for a controversial touchdown from deep in the Texans' territory.  With their 2nd-straight overtime victory, the Texans improved to 10–1, 1–0 on Thanksgiving, and 2–1 against the Lions all-time. Mikel Leshore of Detroit struck first to make it 7-0. In the 2nd,   Arian Foster scored to make it 7-7. Mike Thomas caught to make it 14-7 Detroit. Matt Schaub then hit Owen Daniels to make it 14-14. 2 plays later Calvin Johnson caught it to make it 21-14 Lions at the half. Jason Hanson made one to make it 24-14. Then Justin Forsett scored on an 81-yard run that clearly showed that Forsett was down by contact, but was illegally challenged; it  made it 24-21. Shayne Graham would follow suit with a 45-yard FG to tie it at 24, but Detroit would retake the lead early in the 4th quarter with a Joique Bell 23-yard TD run to make the score 31-24. Foster scored his 2nd TD late in regulation to tie the game at 31. The Texans got the last laugh as Graham would nail the 32-yard game-winner with 2:21 left in overtime to win the game 34-31.

Week 13: at Tennessee Titans

After a grueling stretch where they endured two hard-fought overtime matches over a span of 5 days, the Texans took the opportunity of a prolonged week to heal up and rest in advance of the stretch run to the playoffs.  The Texans took the AFC's best record into Tennessee to face a reeling Titans team, fresh off of firing their offensive coordinator earlier in the week.  The Texans staked out to an early lead and never looked back as the defense forced 6 Titans turnovers and held Titans running back Chris Johnson to 51 yards en route to a relatively stress free 24–10 victory.  With the win, the Texans set a new team record for wins in a season, while improving to 11–1 and also clinched the franchise's second straight trip to the playoffs and swept the Titans for the first time since 2004.

Week 14: at New England Patriots

The Texans were thoroughly outplayed in what would turn out to be a preview of the Divisional Round rematch between both teams. The Texans dropped to 11–2 with the loss.

Week 15: vs. Indianapolis Colts

With their victory over the Colts, the Texans improved to 12–2 on the season and 5–0 against division rivals, thereby securing their second AFC South title in franchise history. Because the Patriots dropped to 10–4 several hours later on the same day, the Texans can clinch homefield advantage throughout the playoffs by winning at least one of their two remaining games by virtue of their head-to-head tiebreaker over the Broncos.

Week 16: vs. Minnesota Vikings

With the loss in their regular season home finale, the Texans dropped to 12–3 on the season and 6–2 at home, finishing 0–2 at home against NFC North teams. Houston remains winless (0–3) against the Minnesota Vikings in franchise history.

Week 17: at Indianapolis Colts

Hoping to rebound from a tough loss, the Texans traveled to Indianapolis for game 2 against the Andrew Luck-led Colts.  However, the Texans lost this game and finished 12–4 for the season and 0–11 against the Colts in Indianapolis. With wins by the Broncos and Patriots, the Texans dropped in conference standings, taking the AFC's #3 seed for the 2nd straight year, and would host the Bengals in the Wild Card Round of the playoffs—also for a 2nd straight year.

Postseason

AFC Wild Card Playoffs: vs. (6) Cincinnati Bengals

In somewhat of a sloppy game for both teams, the Texans booted the Cincinnati Bengals out of the playoffs for the 2nd straight year and moved on to the Divisional Round. After going up 6–0 on two Shayne Graham field goals to start the game, Matt Schaub threw an interception that was returned for a touchdown to give the Bengals a 7–6 lead. Coming out of halftime, the Texans defense stiffened up for the rest of the game, forcing the Bengals to 0–9 on 3rd down conversions, holding 2nd-year QB Andy Dalton to 14 completions in 30 attempts for 127 passing yards, and only 2 more field goals as the Texans hung on for the victory.

AFC Divisional Playoffs: at (2) New England Patriots

The Texans were eliminated from the playoffs for the 2nd year in a row in a game reminiscent of the Week 14 matchup against the Patriots. Entering the game, both teams combined were 12–0 at home against other AFC teams.  Again, the Texans were outplayed and out-coached, losing despite possessing the ball for about 31:34 minutes compared to their opponent's 28:36. An intercepted pass that doomed a promising drive and a turnover on downs late in the 3rd quarter put the game out of reach as New England ran away with the score, boasting impressive performances from QB Tom Brady, RBs Stevan Ridley and Shane Vereen, and WR Wes Welker.

Standings

Division

Conference

Statistics

Team

Individual

Source:

References

External links
 

Houston
Houston Texans seasons
AFC South championship seasons